The women's 4 × 100 metres relay event at the 1982 Commonwealth Games was held on 9 October at the QE II Stadium in Brisbane, Australia.

Results

References

Final results (The Sydney Morning Herald)
Final results (The Canberra Times)
Australian results 

Athletics at the 1982 Commonwealth Games
1982